Tsarist Russia may refer to:
Grand Duchy of Moscow (1480–1547)
Tsardom of Russia (1547–1721)
Russian Empire (1721–1917)